is a song recorded by Japanese boy band Arashi. It was released on July 12, 2000 by the record label Pony Canyon. While both the regular and limited editions were released as a CD single containing two songs and its instrumentals, only the limited edition included a poster.

Music video
The music video begins in sepia tone, with the band, wearing leather jackets and assorted greaser wear, sitting in an alley while singing the song. As it reaches its first chorus, they stand up and sing directly to the camera. As the song changes to its faster-paced latter half, the scene transitions to the band, now wearing loose-fitting and colorful casual clothes, performing dance routines in a brightly lit white and blue studio. Intercut are scenes of the band singing in a darker hallway with mirrored walls.

Commercial performance
By selling 256,510 copies, the single debuted at number three on the Oricon weekly singles chart.

Track listing

Charts and certifications

Weekly charts

Year-end charts

Sales and certifications

References

External links
 "Typhoon Generation" product information 
 "Typhoon Generation" Yahoo! Japan music profile 
 "Typhoon Generation" Karao single ranking profile 

Arashi songs
2000 singles
2000 songs
Pony Canyon singles